The Our Lady of Peace Cathedral or simply Cathedral of Bukavu, is a religious building of the Catholic Church which is located in the city of Bukavu in the east end of the African country of the Democratic Republic of the Congo, specifically in the province of South Kivu.

History
The cathedral was built from 1948 to 1951, and its formal consecration took place on 18 October 1951. It follows the Roman or Latin rite and serves as the headquarters of the Metropolitan Archdiocese of Bukavu (Archidioecesis Bukavuensis) which was created in 1959 by the bull "Cum parvulum" by the Pope John XXIII.

It is under the pastoral responsibility of Archbishop François-Xavier Maroy Rusengo.

See also
Roman Catholicism in the Democratic Republic of the Congo
Our Lady of Peace Cathedral

References

Roman Catholic cathedrals in the Democratic Republic of the Congo
Buildings and structures in Bukavu
Roman Catholic churches completed in 1951
20th-century Roman Catholic church buildings in the Democratic Republic of the Congo